Paul Bie-Eyene is a Gabonese diplomat.
From  till  he was Ambassador Extraordinary and Plenipotentiary in Luanda.
From  till  he was Ambassador Extraordinary and Plenipotentiary in Pretoria.
From  till  he was Ambassador Extraordinary and Plenipotentiary in Moscow the Russian Federation.
From  till  he was Secrétaire Général of the Ministère des Affaires Etrangères Gabún.
In the Gabonese legislative election, 2011 he became member of the National Assembly of Gabon as a candidate of the Gabonese Democratic Party 12e Législature (2012-2017)

See also 
 Ambassador of Gabon to Russia :ru:Посольство Габона в России

References 

Gabonese diplomats
Year of birth missing (living people)
Living people
Ambassadors of Gabon to Angola
Ambassadors of Gabon to South Africa
Ambassadors of Gabon to Russia
Ambassadors of Gabon to Ukraine
21st-century Gabonese people